6478 Gault, provisional designation , is a Phocaea asteroid from the inner regions of the asteroid belt, approximately  in diameter. 
The likely S-type asteroid was discovered on 12 May 1988, by astronomer couple Carolyn and Eugene Shoemaker at the Palomar Observatory in California. It was named in honor of planetary geologist . In January 2019, it was found that Gault shows cometary activity and that it has multiple tails, making it an active asteroid. It was subsequently realised that it had been active since at least 2013.

Orbit and classification 

Gault is a core member of the Phocaea family. The large asteroid family consists of nearly 2,000 known stony asteroids, and was named after its largest member, 25 Phocaea. The old family formed up to 2.2 billion years ago and has the highest inclination of all families in the inner asteroid belt. Several of its members are also Mars-crossing asteroids with high eccentricities.

It orbits the Sun at a distance of 1.9–2.8 AU once every 3 years and 6 months (1,278 days; semi-major axis of 2.31 AU). Its orbit has an eccentricity of 0.19 and an inclination of 23° with respect to the ecliptic. The body's observation arc begins with its official discovery observation at Palomar in May 1988. It last came to perihelion in January 2020 and will next come to perihelion in July 2023.

Main-belt comet 

On January 5, 2019, it was discovered that Gault possesses a comet tail, which had not been present in previous images taken during the 2018/19 opposition. The asteroid began to break up  as its spin accelerated due to the YORP effect, and its rotation speed approached two hoursnear the limit of stability for an asteroid. Earlier hypotheses of a collision with another asteroid were ruled out as a source of the tail-forming dust, and its two tails were believed to be a result of sudden dust ejections near October 28 and December 30, 2018. It is also possible that solar heating caused sublimation of ice, perhaps beneath the surface in a "pocket," and the force of the ejection of material (after being exposed to solar heating during the rotation of the asteroid) resulted in the spin rate increase. A prior example of such an occurrence is in the literature.

In April 2019, upon analyzing archive images taken in 2013, 2016 and 2017, it was found that Gault had been perpetually active for at least five years before the discovery, with a tail visible when the asteroid was near its furthest distance from the Sun during the 2013 apparition. If its activity is indeed caused by a rotational breakup, then Gault has remained active far longer than any other object of this type seen before. This indicates that it may represent a new type of object.

Naming 

This minor planet was named in memory of American planetary geologist  (1923–1999), an expert in the field of impact crater forming processes. Gault conducted field experiments and applied his insight to the interpretation of impact data from the Moon, Earth, Mars and Mercury. The official  was published by the Minor Planet Center on 28 July 1999.

Physical characteristics 

Gault spectral type resembles that of a stony S-type asteroid, according its membership to the Phocaea family, but some of the features of the spectrum are more similar to the carbonaceous C-type asteroid class. Based on a generic magnitude-to-diameter conversion, the asteroid measures approximately 3.7 kilometers in diameter, for an assumed family-specific albedo of 0.22, and an absolute magnitude of 14.4. Rotational lightcurves of Gault obtained from photometric observations in 2019 showed a rotation period of either 1.79 or 3.36 hours. The body's pole and shape remain unknown, but based on its lightcurve, its surface likely has irregularities and concavities.

Gallery

References

External links 
 image of (6478) Gault showing tail, astrobin.com
 Dictionary of Minor Planet Names, Google books
 Discovery Circumstances: Numbered Minor Planets (5001)-(10000) – Minor Planet Center
 
 

006478
006478
Discoveries by Carolyn S. Shoemaker
Discoveries by Eugene Merle Shoemaker
Named minor planets
19880512